Kim Jacinthe Poirier (born February 6, 1980) is a Canadian actress, singer, film producer, and television host.

Biography

Personal life
Born in Drummondville, Quebec, the daughter of actress/model Carol Laquerre who was Miss Toronto in 1976, she has one sister. She enjoys watching movies, writing, meditating, jogging, playing guitar, and singing. She does volunteer work for the homeless. Poirier is fluent in both French and English.

Professionally trained in yoga, she has studied numerology, healing, and nutrition.

Career 
As a child growing up in Toronto, Ontario, Poirier worked in modeling and TV commercials, moving into TV and film acting in adulthood. She did catalogue modelling and commercials for Aquafresh, Ontario Tourism, Ontario Place, Bell Canada, Turtles Chocolates, Old El Paso, Toronto Eaton Centre, Pizza Pizza and Ford.

She was up for a lead female role in the TV show Breaker High when she was only 15 but when they asked her to remove her tongue ring she refused and did not get the role.

In 1996 she guest starred on sci-fi show PSI Factor: Chronicles of the Paranormal as Marisa, and was asked to write an anecdote for the book "Science Fiction Television Series 1990-2004" in 2007 about her role on the show. This was Kim's debut acting role. She went on to guest star in another show in the same year called Straight Up in which she had a small role as AJ's Gang Member.

In the following year she had a small role in a TV movie called Naked City: Justice with a Bullet as Young Lover 1 and in 1999 had a small role in The Hunt for the Unicorn Killer as a girl who had an affair with Ira Einhorn but her scenes were cut from the film. Kim has stated that because of this, it is her least favorite role. She went on to have a supporting role in the TV pilot A Bachelor's Guide to Seduction in the Kitchen as Linda. It was shot for Arcadia Entertainment however it wasn't picked up, though some European countries expressed interest in it. Kim also had another small role in TV movie Rated X as Jamie the "Actress", who gets hit on by Artie Mitchell in a jacuzzi. She also guest starred on the TV show Twice in a Lifetime as Amanda, the sister of Delia Harmony whom she has a fight with and dies before she can leave town. She also guest starred on The Gavin Crawford Show as Jenna.

In 2001, her career took off when she became a regular in the Canadian TV Show Paradise Falls as Roxy Hunter, the trailer trash girl who has many personal troubles, such as being kidnapped, bound, and gagged in a cabin by a mysterious villain. The first season had 52 episodes. She also had a supporting role in the TV movie Danger Beneath the Sea as Lisa Alford, the pregnant wife who's left alone in a town where she does not really know anyone after her husband leaves for the submarines.

In 2002, she had a small supporting role in the TV movie Pretend You Don't See Her as Heather Greco, an actress who is keeping a dark secret about her boyfriends life. She then went on to play a supporting role in the straight-to-video American Psycho II: All American Girl as Barbara, the bitchy student who wants the T.A. position that Professor Starkman's offering. She guest starred as Holly for 4 episodes in the MTV show Undressed in its sixth and final season. Kim then went on to guest star in the comedy show I Love Mummy as Young Esther, a small supporting role in TV movie The Rats as Jay, a guest star appearance as Denise on Doc and guest starring on Puppets Who Kill as Evelyn, a beautiful worker at a department store who uses her looks to her advantage.

In 2003, she guest starred on TV show Largo Winch as Jacqueline Lindley, the daughter of a newsman target by adriatic commission who falls for Largo but does not want her father to get tangled up in danger. She sings the song La Bamba in the episode. She appeared at the 2003 Much Music Video Music Awards and the 1st Annual Spaceys. It was in 2004 that Kim got her first lead role in a feature film as Constance in Decoys, an alien who falls in love with Roger. She promoted the film on chat show Open Mike with Mike Bullard. She also had a memorable supporting role in the remake of Dawn of the Dead as Monica, a survivor from the church who was saved by Norma and has a tragic ending. Kim returned to her role as Roxy Hunter for the 2nd season of Paradise Falls which had 26 episodes. The long break between Season 1 and 2 had left many fans believing the show had been cancelled. She also had a supporting role in the CBS TV movie While I Was Gone as Dana Jablonski, a popular free spirited hippie who is best friends with Jo in the 60s.

In 2005, she appeared in the short film The Archer as Lisa, the girlfriend of a delinquent. It was directed by John Palmer and produced by the Penney brothers, it also starred Anthony Furey and Dov Tiefenbach. The film has had a few screenings at Canadian Short Film Festivals. She joined Space channel after co-hosting the 05 Spaceys. She became a regular on-air presenter for HypaSpace and did 1-2 minute segments on Drive-In Classics every Saturday before the Horror Marathon and did the voiceovers for the promos of Steamy Windshields from 2005 until 2007. She also appeared in the audience of the MuchMusic TV special Audioslave Live@Much.

In 2006, she co-hosted the 06 Spaceys and was the on-air presenter for another original show for the Space channel called Space Top 10 Countdown. She signed up with King Talent Inc. in September and in November, director George Miller was so charmed by Kim Poirier during an interview on HypaSpace, he got Warner Bros to contact her producer at Space and asked her to write a blurb for a TV show discussing movies of the week and this time it was about Happy Feet. She accepted the offer. Her official website was also redesigned and launched with a new link.

In 2007, she did a group class stage workshop with Tom Todoroff and it was her first time on stage. She said it has made her want to do some theater acting. She announced that she will be appearing on The Search For The Balanced Life which she filmed in February (initially it was Intuitive Security for Women). She returned as Constance Snowden for the straight-to-DVD Decoys 2: Alien Seduction. She appeared in an episode of Best! Movies! Ever! in which she talked about her role on Decoys, she also returned for the second and last season of the show Space Top 10 Countdown. She got a part in the musical The Pirates of Penzance but she had to drop out after getting too busy. She also announced that she will be part of Paradise Falls third season, which at the time had no new episodes since 2004. She had a featured photoshoot for local magazine "Our Neighbourhood", hosted The Best of the Spaceys and co-hosted the 07 Spaceys. In March, she landed a lead supporting role in the Lifetime movie called How I Married My High School Crush as Kate Duncan, the hyper and fun best friend of Sara. In July, she left HypaSpace/Drive-In Classics and began filming for the third season of Paradise Falls, which lasted until October.

In 2008, she returned to HypaSpace on the 8th March. She returns as Roxy Hunter once more in the popular Canadian TV show Paradise Falls third season which started airing on here! TV from 11 April and on Showcase around October. She took part in the Sporting Life 10k run in Toronto in May. She auditioned for the role of Tess Mercer on Smallville but did not get the role. She also got involved with being a producer on a film which she promoted at Cannes 2008 called The Gospel of Phi, it had a limited screening in Canada in 2007. She attended Cannes 2008 with actress/producer Lisa Wegner and producer John Davidson to promote the film and came up with the poster concept for the film. She also moved to Vancouver, British Columbia. HypaSpace came to an end on June 27, 2008 and was Kim's last episode after four years of being on the show. She then completed filming for the horror movie Silent But Deadly in the summer, she plays the lead role Sandra. She is a guest speaker in the Burman Books DVD The Search For The Balanced Life  which was released on September 1, 2008 (filming was in February 2007). After filming completed for Silent But Deadly she attended the 2008 Toronto International Film Festival and guest starred in the HypaSpace replacement The Circuit to talk about the movie. She also had interviews with website Hardcore Nerdity and radio show The VM Underground Show. She filmed her scenes for an episode of Eureka which aired in 2009. She also joined the band Jacqui Judge & the Gallows as their backing vocalist.

In 2009, she went to Winnipeg, Manitoba to shoot the movie Foodland, directed by Adam Smoluk. The movie marks the first time she will be singing on screen in a feature film, she plays Lucy Eklund the femme fatale who's a con artist by day and cabaret singer at night. She sings the song "You Made Me Love You (I Didn't Want to Do It)". She was originally cast in the role of Miranda Kirby for the show Happy Town but was replaced by Linda Kash the night before shooting. She sang with Corduroy live for Canadian Music Week in Toronto at Bread and Circus on March 13 and also performed at VTV Live on April 29 with Bob & The Mob singing the songs Ballroom Blitz, Mustang Sally, Jailhouse Rock, Green River, Born On A Bayou, Ghost Riders In The Sky, 13 Women, Little Help From My Friends and Chilly Walla. She recently performed at VTV Live again on May 19 but this time with her band Jacqui Judge & Rouge singing their original songs Addictions, Shades, Pretty, Breathe UnderWater, Wishes and a cover of Radiohead's Jigsaw Falling Into Place. She had to leave the band after moving to Los Angeles but can be heard on their song Fuck or Fight. She played Dr. Maria Leonardo, a dendrologist, in the episode "Welcome Back, Carter" of Eureka.

In 2010, she was cast as Helen Gleason in the movie Four Saints, which has since fallen through due to funds, and was announced as a producer for the upcoming movie All You Need Is Luck although the movie was never made. She is also set to star in the trailer for Wade which will possibly become a feature film. She guest starred as Camille, a college roommate of Megan's who has now become an actress, in the episode "Tomorrowland" of Mad Men. She has also filmed another episode of Eureka the episode will air in 2011. The film Foodland premiered in Winnipeg and had a limited run.

In 2011, she returned as Dr. Maria Leonardo in Eureka for the episode "Clash of the Titans". She filmed the Michael Sardo pilot called Normal starring as Dr. Landres, the pilot wasn't picked up. She attended the 2011 Toronto Comic Con and was interviewed by InnerSpace. She was also in the feature film called Dreams playing Christine, the film has recently been retitled as Awaken. She filmed the trailer for the feature film version of Wade in July playing a character called Jacey. She has been cast as Felicia DeMello in the movie Deception but the project didn't go ahead. She is currently working with Moving Pictures Media Group on several projects. She filmed a guest star role playing Tracey for the upcoming CBS show The Exes. The movie Silent But Deadly finally premiered on Super Channel in Canada.

In 2012, her episode of The Exes premiered in which she guest starred as Tracey in the episode "Lost In Translation". The trailer movie she shot, as the zombie killing Jacey, called Wade premiered on January 25 in Breakers Bar, Michigan. She is also the new host of the web series on POP Galaxy. The movie Awaken premiered at Newport Beach International Film Festival on April 30. She shot the trailer for horror movie 100 Days of Death playing the character Alison. She has been attached to play Andrea in the horror movie Shhh due for a 2014 release. She is producing and starring in the DVD series Hollywood's Insider Secrets.

In 2013, Kim has done various radio interviews to promote the kickstarter for the graphic novel for the upcoming 100 Days of Death franchise. She starred in the short film The Program as Jessica. She also stars in the feature film No Ordinary Hero: The SuperDeafy Movie as Erica and in another short film 'M is for Milf'. She has been cast in No Solicitors' as Nicole Cutterman 'and Night Wings as Audrey.

In 2014, Kim has been cast as April in After The Harvest in which she's also a producer. She's also producing the horror film The Jokesters. She starred as the lead in the Emily Stone short film/book trailer which was released in October.

 Filmography 

 Hosting and own appearances 
 2003 Much Music Video Music Awards (2003) as herself
 1st Annual Spaceys (2003) as herself
 Surviving the Dawn (2004) as herself (uncredited)
 Decoys: Behind the Scenes (2004) as herself
 Open Mike with Mike Bullard (episode dated 1 March 2004) (TV series) as herself
 05 Spaceys (2005) as herself - On-Air Presenter
 Audioslave Live@Much (2005) as herself (uncredited)
 Breakfast Television (episode dated 26 March 2006) (TV series) as herself
 06 Spaceys (2006) as herself - On-Air Presenter
 Best! Movies! Ever! (episode Alien Invasions) (2007) (TV series) as herself
 Space Top 10 Countdown (2006) (TV series) as herself - On-Air Presenter (2006–2007)
 The Best of the Spaceys (2007) as herself - On-Air Presenter
 07 Spaceys (2007) as herself - On-Air Presenter
 Drive-In Classics (2001) (TV series) as herself - On-Air Presenter (2005–2007)
 HypaSpace (2002–2008) (TV series) as herself - On-Air Presenter (2005–2008)
 The Search For The Balanced Life (2008) as herself
 The Circuit (1 episode) (2008) (TV series) as herself
 InnerSpace (1 episode) (2011) (TV series) as herself
 Fashion News Live (1 episode) (2011) as herself
 POP Galaxy (2012) (Web series) as herself - Host
 Hollywood's Insider Secrets: Classic Hollywood Makeup (2013) as herself - Host

 Producer credits 
 The Gospel of Phi (2007)
 Hollywood's Insider Secrets: Horror Techniques and Special FX (2013)
 Hollywood's Insider Secrets: Classic Hollywood Makeup (2013)
 Hollywood's Insider Secrets: Fun with Face Painting (2013)
 After The Harvest (2014)
 The Jokesters (2014)
 Mad Mex
 100 Days of Death
 Blue Valley, USA

 Music 
She was a vocalist for the band Jacqui Judge & Rouge in 2009 but had to leave due to her move to Los Angeles, she features on their song Fuck or Fight. She has also guest performed with Corduroy and Bob & The Mob. She has sung on an episode of Largo Winch and in the feature film Foodland''.

References

External links 
 
 
 The Actor's Compendium - Kim Poirier's Actor's Compendium Page
 
 Production Company

1980 births
Actresses from Quebec
Anglophone Quebec people
Canadian film actresses
Canadian soap opera actresses
Canadian television actresses
French Quebecers
Living people
People from Drummondville